Jack Austin (birth unknown), also known by the nicknames of "Cowboy", and "Fiery Jack", is a former professional rugby league footballer who played in the 1960s, 1970s and 1980s, and coached in the 1980s.

Playing career

BBC2 Floodlit Trophy Final appearances
Jack Austin played , i.e. number 5, and scored a try in Castleford's 7-2 victory over Swinton in the 1966 BBC2 Floodlit Trophy Final during the 1966–67 season at Wheldon Road, Castleford on Tuesday 20 December 1966, and played , and scored a try in Bramley's 15-7 victory over Widnes in the 1973 BBC2 Floodlit Trophy Final during the 1973–74 season at Naughton Park, Widnes on Tuesday 18 December 1973.

References

External links
Jack Austin Memory Box Search at archive.castigersheritage.com

Bramley RLFC Legends - Jack Austin

Living people
Bradford Bulls players
Bramley RLFC players
Castleford Tigers players
Dewsbury Rams players
English rugby league coaches
English rugby league players
Hunslet R.L.F.C. coaches
Place of birth missing (living people)
Rugby league wingers
Wakefield Trinity players
Year of birth missing (living people)